A sausage roll is a savoury pastry meal, popular in current and former Commonwealth nations, consisting of sausage meat wrapped in puff pastry. Sausage rolls are sold at retail outlets and are also available from bakeries as a take-away food. A miniature version can be served as buffet or party food.

Composition

The basic composition of a sausage roll is sheets of puff pastry formed into tubes around sausage meat and glazed with egg or milk before being baked. They can be served either hot or cold. In the 19th century, they were made using shortcrust pastry instead of puff pastry.

A vegetarian or vegan approximation of a sausage roll can be made in the same manner, using a meat substitute.

Sales

In the UK, the bakery chain Greggs sells around 2.5 million sausage rolls per week, or around 140 million per year.

History
The wrapping of meat or other foodstuffs into dough can be traced back to the Classical Greek or Roman eras. Sausage rolls in the modern sense of meat surrounded by rolled pastry appear to have been conceived at the beginning of the 19th century in France. From the beginning, use was made of flaky pastry, which in turn originated with the Austrian croissant of the late 17th century. Early versions of the roll with pork as a filling proved popular in London during the Napoleonic Wars and it became identified as an English dish.

On 20 September 1809, the Bury and Norwich Post mentions T. Ling, aged 75, (an industrious vendor of saloop, buns, and sausage rolls). The Times first mentions the food item in 1864 when William Johnstone, "wholesale pork pie manufacturer and sausage roll maker", was fined £15 (£ in 2021), under the Nuisances Removal Act (Amendment) Act 1863, for having on his premises a large quantity of meat unsound, unwholesome and unfit for food. In 1894, a theft case provided further insights into the Victorian sausage roll production whereby the accused apprentice was taught to soak brown bread in red ochre, salt, and pepper to give the appearance of beef sausage for the filling.

National variants
Similar meat and pastry recipes include the Czech klobásník, the Belgian worstenbroodje, the Dutch saucijzenbroodje, the German Münsterländer Wurstbrötchen and sausage bread in the United States.

Hong Kong has developed its own style of sausage roll. Instead of having sausage meat wrapped in puff pastry like the traditional western style, the Hong Kong style "sausage bun" (Chinese: 腸仔包) consists of a sausage wrapped inside a soft milk bread style bun.

In popular culture
 The 1896 Gilbert and Sullivan operetta The Grand Duke features sausage rolls as a plot device, where conspirators recognise one another by eating sausage rolls.
LadBaby has had four number one Christmas singles in the British charts with sausage-roll-themed novelty cover versions of the songs "We Built This City", "I Love Rock 'n' Roll", "Don't Stop Believing" and "Merry Christmas".

See also

 List of sausage dishes
 List of stuffed dishes
 Pigs in a blanket
 Jambon

References

External links

 Sausage Roll recipe - BBC Food website
 Sausage Roll recipe - taste.com.au

British snack foods
Fast food
Sausage dishes
Street food
Australian cuisine
British cuisine
Dutch cuisine
French cuisine
German cuisine
New Zealand cuisine